Peg Yorkin (born 1927) is a funder of American feminist activism.

Biography
Yorkin grew up in New York City. An only child, born to a Catholic father and Jewish mother, she described her family household as "genteel poverty". Her father's alcoholism negated his career as a cinematographer for legendary filmmaker D.W. Griffith and forced the family to live "on the kindness of my mother's relatives."
Yorkin was raised in neither religion and described herself as "no believer". "The religions are patriarchal. I don't believe in any of them, or a God, or a Goddess."
She went to Barnard College, had a brief acting stint and an early marriage that lasted two years.
Yorkin married Bud Yorkin from 1954 until their divorce in 1984.

In 1991, she made a  endowment and gift to the Feminist Majority Foundation (which she was a cofounder and is the chair of) and the Fund for the Feminist Majority, a sister organization that she co-founded in 1987. The first program of the endowment was to help make RU 486 or another anti-progestin available to women.

She spoke at the Feminist Expo 2000 at the Baltimore Convention Center, and has also produced live theater in Los Angeles.

Criticism 
She was criticized by Bitch magazine for saying in 2009, in regard to Roman Polanski, “My personal thoughts are let the guy go. It’s bad a person was raped. But that was so many years ago. The guy has been through so much in his life. It’s crazy to arrest him now. Let it go. The government could spend its money on other things.”

Awards 
She received the Women of Courage Award in 1993.

Personal life 
Yorkin married TV producer Bud Yorkin in 1954; they divorced in 1986. They have two children (Nicole and David), both are TV writers. She has four grandchildren.

References

1927 births
Living people
American feminists
Activists from New York City
Jewish feminists
20th-century American Jews
American people of Jewish descent
Barnard College alumni
21st-century American Jews